The IEEE Computer Science & Undergraduate Teaching Award is a Technical Field Award of the IEEE that was established by the IEEE Computer Society in 1999.  It is presented for outstanding contributions to undergraduate computer science education through teaching and service.

The award nomination requires a minimum of 3 endorsements.

Recipients of this award receive a certificate, and honorarium.

Recipients
The recipients of the IEEE Computer Science & Engineering Undergraduate Teaching Award include the following people:
 2017: Sven Koenig
 2016: Mark Sherriff
 2015: Henry C.B. Chan
 2014: Elizabeth Gerber
 2013: Robert J. Fornaro
 2012: Mark Guzdial
 2011: Benjamin Hescott
 2010: No Award
 2009: Judy Robertson
 2008: Elizabeth L. Burd	
 2007: Darrin M. Hanna	
 2006: No Award		
 2005: No Award		
 2004: No Award
 2003: Sally Fincher	
 2002: Alan Clements	
 2001: Steven S. Skiena, and David G. Meyer		
 2000: No Award
 1999: Joseph L. Zachary, and Bruce W. Weide and Timothy J. Long

References 

Computer Science and Engineering Undergraduate Teaching Award
Computer science education